Jennings Township is one of thirteen townships in Owen County, Indiana, United States. As of the 2010 census, its population was 846 and it contained 405 housing units.

History
Jennings Township was organized in 1842. It was named for T. C. Jennings, who played an active role in its establishment.

The Cataract Falls Covered Bridge was listed on the National Register of Historic Places in 2005.

Geography

Unincorporated towns
 Cataract at 
(This list is based on USGS data and may include former settlements.)

Cemeteries
The township contains Maze Cemetery.

Lakes
 Paradise Lake

School districts
 Cloverdale Community Schools

Political districts
 State House District 46
 State Senate District 37

References
 
 United States Census Bureau 2009 TIGER/Line Shapefiles
 IndianaMap

External links
 Indiana Township Association
 United Township Association of Indiana
 City-Data.com page for Jennings Township

Townships in Owen County, Indiana
Townships in Indiana